Bernard Glemser (May 20, 1908–April 3, 1990), also known under pen-names Robert Crane and Geraline Napier,  was a writer of fiction, non-fiction, and children's books. He served in the Royal Air Force as an intelligence officer during World War II, and then worked in the United States for the government of Britain for a few years. Subsequently, he devoted himself to writing, and his first novel, Love for Each Other, appeared in 1946.  During the 1930s and 1940s he was married to the journalist and editor Louise Cripps Samoiloff.

One of his novels, Girl on the Wing, was made into a movie entitled Come Fly With Me (then re-issued as The Fly Girls). Glemser also used pen names—as Robert Crane, he wrote science fiction, notably Hero's Walk (1954), and as Geraline Napier, romances. In nonfiction, he wrote Man Against Cancer (1969) based on his interviews with notable cancer researchers.

Glemser's books for children, such as All About the Human Body and All About Biology, were translated into many languages and distributed in Africa, Asia, and the Middle East by UNESCO.

External links

References

1908 births
1990 deaths
British emigrants to the United States
20th-century English novelists